132nd meridian may refer to:

132nd meridian east, a line of longitude east of the Greenwich Meridian
132nd meridian west, a line of longitude west of the Greenwich Meridian